Fortitude is a one-act play written by Kurt Vonnegut in 1968, and broadly based on Mary Shelley's 1818 novel Frankenstein; or, The Modern Prometheus. The brief [19 page] play relates to the issues of robotics and the ethical dilemmas of the "cyborg's rights." It was featured in the anthologies, Human-Machines: An Anthology of Stories About Cyborgs (Edited by Thomas N. Scortia and George Zebrowski New York: Vintage, 1975) and The Ultimate Frankenstein (edited by Byron Preiss, New York: Dell Publishing, 1991). The story was also featured in the 1991 made-for-cable-TV anthology Kurt Vonnegut's Monkey House.

Synopsis 
The story follows Dr. Elbert Little on a visit to Dr. Frankenstein's and his assistant Dr. Tom Swift's laboratory. Frankenstein's only patient and life work is Sylvia Lovejoy, who after some 70 operations has been reduced to a head on a tripod that is controlled by Frankenstein's machines. One of Sylvia's mood machines has malfunctioned, causing her to slip into a deep depression and to write Dr. Little to request that he provide her with cyanide. Seeing Sylvia's diminished emotional state getting worse, Gloria, Sylvia's beautician and only friend, agrees that Sylvia's only remaining freedom is "the power to commit suicide." Frankenstein fires Gloria for speaking about death in Sylvia's presence. Gloria sneaks back into Sylvia's room while she is sleeping and leaves her a revolver. Sylvia finds the gun and tries to kill herself, but her prosthetic arms have been designed to prevent her from doing so. Instead, she shoots Frankenstein, who promptly becomes the second head attached to the machines.

References

1968 plays
Works by Kurt Vonnegut
Plays based on Frankenstein